In the 2018 Seoul Open Challenger Doubles tennis tournament, Hsieh Cheng-peng and Peng Hsien-yin were the defending champions but chose to defend their title with different partners. Hsieh partnered Christopher Rungkat but lost in the quarterfinals to Toshihide Matsui and Frederik Nielsen. Peng partnered Aliaksandr Bury but lost in the semifinals to Chen Ti and Yi Chu-huan.

Matsui and Nielsen won the title after defeating Chen and Yi 6–4, 7–6(7–3) in the final.

Seeds

Draw

References
 Main Draw
 Qualifying Draw

Seoul Open Challenger - Doubles
2018 Doubles